Beristain is a surname. Notable people with the surname include:

Arturo Beristain (born 1949), Mexican professional wrestler
 Dolores Beristáin 1926–2010, Mexican actress
Gabriel Beristain (born 1955), Mexican cinematographer
 Ignacio Beristáin (born 1939), Mexican boxing coach 
José Mariano Beristain (1756–1817), Mexican bibliographer and writer
 Lucía Beristaín (born 1968), Mexican politician 
 Luis Beristáin (1918–1962), Mexican actor
Luz María Beristain (born 1963), Mexican politician
 Moisés Beristáin, Mexican para-athlete
Naiara Beristain (born 1992), Spanish footballer
 Víctorino Beristain (born 1956), Mexican water polo player 
 Carlos Calvo (footballer, born 1992) (Carlos Calvo Beristain), Mexican footballer
 Iñaki Goikoetxea (Iñaki Goikoetxea Beristain, born 1982), Spanish footballer

Basque-language surnames